Alex Afenyo Markin is the member of parliament of Effutu constituency, he is on the ticket of NPP. He took over from Mike Allen Hammah who was elected on the ticket of the National Democratic Congress (NDC) and won a majority of 13,114 votes to become the MP. He succeeded Samuel Owusu Agyei who had represented the constituency in the 4th Republic parliament on the ticket of the New Patriotic Party (NPP).

See also
List of Ghana Parliament constituencies

References 

Parliamentary constituencies in the Central Region (Ghana)